The men's snowboard cross event in snowboarding at the 2006 Winter Olympics was held in Bardonecchia, a village in the Province of Turin, Italy. Competition took place on 16 February 2006.

Medalists

Results

Qualification

All competitors raced two qualification runs, with only the best of the two times used in the final ranking. The top 32 of the 36 competitors advanced to the 1/8 finals. Struck-through runs in the table below represent the discarded time for a competitor. Only one snowboarder, Michal Novotny, had first run that was faster than his second run.

Elimination round
The top 32 qualifiers advanced to the 1/8 round. From here, they participated in four-person elimination races, with the top two from each race advancing.

1/8 round

Heat 1

Heat 2

Heat 3

Heat 4

Heat 5

Heat 6

Heat 7

Heat 8

Quarterfinals

Quarterfinal 1

Quarterfinal 2

Quarterfinal 3

Quarterfinal 4

Semifinals

Semifinal 1

Semifinal 2

Finals

The four semifinalists who failed to advanced to the big final competed in the small final to determine 5th through 8th places. The four last place finishers in the quarterfinals contested a 13th–16th classification race, while the third-placed finishers raced for 9th through 13th.

Large Final

Small Final

Classification 9–12

Classification 13–16

References

Snowboarding at the 2006 Winter Olympics
Men's events at the 2006 Winter Olympics